Eugene B. Redmond (born December 1, 1937, St. Louis) is an American poet, and academic. His poetry is closely connected to the Black Arts Movement and the city of East St. Louis, Illinois.

Life
Eugene B. Redmond was born in St. Louis, Missouri. He earned his bachelor's degree from Southern Illinois University (SIU) in 1964, and his master's degree from Washington University in St. Louis in 1966, both in English Literature. He became a teacher-counselor at Southern Illinois University's Experiment in Higher Education, in East St. Louis, where he worked under the direction of Dr. Edward W. Crosby, his mentor, until 1969. He left SIU to teach at Oberlin College for a year, and then joined the faculty at California State University, Sacramento as a professor of English. In 1985 he returned to East St. Louis as the special assistant to the superintendent for cultural and language arts at the East St. Louis School District until 1989. He taught at Wayne State University (1989–90), before joining the faculty at Southern Illinois University Edwardsville (SIUE), where he is currently an emeritus professor of English.

Redmond’s published works include a pamphlet poem and six poetry collections, as well as numerous contributions to journals and anthologies. He has edited two anthologies of African-American poetry and eight works by Henry Dumas. Dumas had taught at nearby Hiram College before he was shot down in a New York subway, in a case of mistaken identity. It was Dr Crosby who pushed to have SIU put Dumas's writings into publication and urged Redmond to edit the works, which Redmond continues to do to this day.

In 1976, Redmond was named Poet Laureate of East St. Louis.

Redmond published his survey and analysis of 200 years of African-American poetry, Drumvoices: The Mission of Afro-American Poetry, A Critical History, in 1976. He is the founding editor of Drumvoices Revue, a multicultural literary journal jointly published by the English Department of Southern Illinois University Edwardsville and the Eugene B. Redmond Writers Club.

Redmond has donated his collection, comprising his personal library, manuscripts, photographs, posters, and other ephemera, to SIUE Lovejoy Library. Selections from the collection have been made available in the online collection EBR African American Cultural Life. Other papers are held at the University of Illinois at Springfield.

Awards
 National Endowment for the Arts Creative Writing Fellowship
 Lifetime Achievement Award from Pan-African Movement USA
 Pushcart Prize: Best of Small Presses 
 Tribute to an Elder from the African Poetry Theater of NYC
 1993 American Book Award for The Eye in the Ceiling: Selected Poems

Works

Contributions to anthologies

 
Marie Harris, Kathleen Aguero, eds (1989), "Epigrams for My Father", An Ear to the Ground, University of Georgia Press. 
 John H. Bracey Jr., Sonia Sanchez, and James Smethurst, eds (2014). "DA-DUM-DUN: A BAM Triumvirate of Conch/Us/Nest: Miles Davis, Henry Dumas & Katherine Dunham in East St. Louis, Illinois (Reminiscence)". SOS-Calling All Black People: A Black Arts Movement Reader. University of Massachusetts Press. .

References

External links
"An undying Black Renaissance: Interview with Eugene B. Redmond", Sentinel Poetry (Online) #40, March 2006.
Janet Grace Riehl, "Eugene B. Redmond, poet laureate of East St. Louis, master teacher", Riehl Life, June 18, 2008.
Drumvoices Revue, Southern Illinois University Edwardsville.
EBR African American Cultural Life (Southern Illinois University Edwardsville) – A digital collection of photographs, posters, and pamphlets selected from the Eugene B. Redmond (EBR) Collection at Lovejoy Library.
The Eugene B. Redmond Interviews—Video oral history interviews with Eugene B. Redmond, accompanied by transcripts.

American male poets
1937 births
Washington University in St. Louis alumni
Southern Illinois University Edwardsville faculty
Living people
Municipal Poets Laureate in the United States
Oberlin College faculty
African-American educators
African-American poets
People from St. Louis
American Book Award winners